Vice Admiral Sir John Morrison Webster KCB (3 November 1932 – 5 October 2020) was a Royal Navy officer who became Flag Officer Plymouth and Port Admiral, Devonport.

Naval career
Educated at Pangbourne College, Webster joined the Royal Navy in 1951. He became Commanding Officer of the frigate HMS Argonaut in 1970, Liaison Officer in Ottawa in 1974 and Commanding Officer of the frigate HMS Cleopatra in 1977. He was appointed Director of Naval Warfare at the Ministry of Defence in 1980, Flag Officer Sea Training in 1982 and Chief of Staff to the Commander-in-Chief Fleet in 1984. He went on to be Flag Officer Plymouth and Port Admiral, Devonport at HMNB Devonport in 1987 before retiring in 1990.

In retirement he became a landscape and marine painter.

He died on 5 October 2020, at the age of 87.

Family
In 1962, he married Valerie Anne "Val" Villiers, daughter of Admiral Sir Michael Villiers; they had one son, who predeceased him, and two daughters.

References

|-

1932 births
2020 deaths
Royal Navy vice admirals
Knights Commander of the Order of the Bath
People educated at Pangbourne College